The I-League is one of the top flight football leagues in Indian football league system. The league was started in 2006 after the old National Football League folded. Dempo have won the league the most times as they have won it twice in 2007–08 and 2009–10. The current I-League  champions are Gokulam Kerala.

History

The first game was played on 24 November 2007 between Dempo Sports Club and Salgaocar Sports Club. The introduction of the I-league seeks to change the way Indian clubs approach football. All club were required to have at least 14 professionals on their books and the introduction of an U19 development team.

After an exciting 18 rounds, Dempo Sports Club won the championship on goal difference with Churchill finishing runners-up. Viva Kerala and Salgaocar Sports Club were both relegated and will play next season in the second division.

Following an AFC review of the I League's progress, the champions of the I-League had been awarded a spot in the prestigious AFC Champions League club championships in 2009.

Then the next season during the 2008–09 season after a successful first season for the I-League, the second season featured 12 teams from four different cities. And for the first time, the champions of the league would qualify for the AFC Champions League while the runners-up qualify for the AFC Cup club championships in 2010. The bottom two teams will be relegated to the I-League 2nd Division in the next season.

The I-League 2008–2009 season ran from 26 September 2008 and went on until 15 April 2009 with a break in December for the Federation Cup and Durand Cup. Most games this season were played on Saturday's and Sunday's to attract a larger crowd.

As far as the prize money is concerned the winner walks away with Rs 5 Million while the runners-up would get Rs 2,8 Million. The third-placed team will be given Rs 2 Million and for the first time the team finishing 4th will also be given Rs 1 Million. The team winning the Fair Play award will be given Rs 100,000. Among the individual prizes there is Rs 50,000 for Best Striker, Rs 25,000 for the best Goalkeeper, Defender, Midfielder and Forward while the Best Player will also be given Rs 25,000. The Man of the Match award of every match will take away Rs 5,000.

The league then expanded to 14 clubs for the 2009–10 season. Salgaocar SC, Viva Kerala, Pune FC and Shillong Lajong were promoted for that season. Dempo SC later won the I-League to earn a spot into the AFC Champions League 2011.

Only 14 clubs played in 2010–11 season, with AFC criteria being taken into consideration expansion has been halted.

For the first time in history the India U-21 team was part of the league, it was based in New Delhi and AIFF ran the club. Its main agenda was to provide first team opportunities to youngsters and groom them for FIFA World Cup 2018. After a long gap, Indian capital of New Delhi and major city Bangalore were back to the top flight.

After 26 matches played by all 14 sides Salgaocar SC came out as the winners while ONGC FC and JCT FC were relegated to I-League 2nd Division.

Seasons

Notes

References